The Super Parental Guardians is a 2016 Philippine action comedy film starring Vice Ganda and Coco Martin. The film is directed by Joyce Bernal and is under the production of Star Cinema. The film marks the second feature film collaboration between Coco and Vice after Beauty and the Bestie. This is Vice Ganda's first non-VIVA Films produced film and the first to be directed by Bernal since Wenn V. Deramas' death in February 2016. This also marks as Vice Ganda's first non-MMFF movie, together with Enteng Kabisote 10 and the Abangers since This Guy's in Love with U Mare! in 2012.

The film grossed  and became one of the highest grossing Filipino films of all time.

Synopsis
The film tells the story of unlikely "parents" Arci (Vice Ganda) and Paco (Coco Martin). Custody of the children Megan (Awra Briguela) and Ernie (Onyok Pineda) was given to Arci just before the death of his best friend Sarah (Matet de Leon). The children's uncle, Paco, has no choice but to live and get along with Arci. As they play the roles of Momshie and Popshie to the children, the craziest and greatest adventure of their lives will now begin.

Plot
Paco (Coco Martin) who lived in the slums is a known gang leader is known for starting gang wars in their neighborhood. Ariel Ciriaco, known as Arci (Vice Ganda) works as an executive assistant to Marife Delos Santos (Assunta de Rossi), wife of General Aldo Delos Santos.  Marife asked Arci if he can be the caretaker of their house, or she will not sponsor his plan to go to South Korea. Arci met his long-time friend Sarah (Matet de Leon), after Arci's Visa to South Korea was approved. Sarah asked Arci that if anything happens to her, he will take care of her sons Melvin Gaspar or Megan (Awra Briguela) and Ernie (Onyok Pineda). A notorious crime syndicate Addictus Anonymous is known for killing people who are addicted to anything. Sarah went to Arci's house, with a knife stabbed in her back and a placard stating that she's addicted to balut or duck eggs. Before dying, Sarah asked Arci to take her sons. In her funeral, Arci encountered Paco and told him that he's here to take the children. But, Paco threatened him and saying that he will be the one to take care of his nephews. Until, Paco decided to stay with Arci along with Megan and Ernie. He said that they will leave when he found out who killed his sister. Megan also found out that Arci is in love with Paco. Megan doesn't want to replace his mother because Paco is like a father to him and Ernie. Now, the Addictus Anonymous is targeting those who are traitors in their organization. In Sarah's diary, they discovered that she had a relationship with three men. These men were members of Addictus Anonymous. But these three were killed.

Megan and Ernie were kidnapped by men of Marife. Paco and Arci caught Clumsy and there, she admits that the children were brought to a train station. Paco and his men and Arci came to save Megan and Ernie. Arci entered the train and knocked down Marife. They poured gasoline and started a fire, causing the train to explode. Arci and the children came out unharmed.

Cast

Main cast
 Vice Ganda as Ariel Ciriaco "Arci" Taulava 
 Coco Martin as Neil "Paco" Nabati

Supporting cast
 Matet de Leon as Sarah Nabati
 Assunta De Rossi as Maria Felicidad "Marife" Delos Santos
 Kiray as Liza de Lima
 Lassy Marquez as Nadine Monio
 MC Calaquian as Kathryn "Kat-tunying" Taberna
 Pepe Herrera as Totoy Buto
 Negi Molina as Clumsy Binay
 Awra Briguela as Melvin Gaspar "Megan" Nabati
 Onyok Pineda as Ernesto "Ernie" Nabati
 Joem Bascon as Jake Alangkwenka
 Lao Rodriguez as Buboy
 Kiko Matos as GGGC Gangster
 Jack Love Falcis as GGGC Gangster
 Relleyson Salazar - Taong Grasa
 Kevin Delgado as Delfin Nabati (Sarah and Paco's Father)
 Angelina Kanapi 
 Derick Hubalde

Special participation
 Bela Padilla as Emmy Soriano
 Jhong Hilario as Val Santos
 Allan Paule as Dylan Dioko
 Jeric Raval as Alex Soriano
 Emilio Garcia as Gen. Ronwaldo "Gen. Aldo" Delos Santos
 Baron Geisler as ADIKTUS Gangster
 Kim Idol as Brgy. Captain

Production
Vice Ganda announced on September 8, 2016, that the shooting for his film with Coco Martin has begun. The film was directed by Joyce Bernal. By November 2016, the production of the film is already done.

Release
On November 7, 2016, Vice stated that his film, then entitled Super Parental Guidance or SPG was already submitted as an entry for the 2016 Metro Manila Film Festival (MMFF) beating the deadline set by the MMFF which was on November 2. The film was not selected as one of the 8 entries to be shown in the film festival. On November 21, Star Cinema announced that the movie would be released in theaters on November 30, 2016.

The film was initially shown in the Philippines at 240 cinemas but was later increased to 280 and then 309 cinemas due to public demand and popularity.

Marketing
The trailer for the film was released on November 21, 2016, which shows that the title of the film was changed to The Super Parental Guardians.

Soundtrack
"Ang Kulit", an original composition by Vice Ganda, was released as the movie's official theme song. It was first heard on November 21, 2016, via MOR 101.9 during a late night show with DJ Joco Loco. Vice and Coco performed the song on ASAP stage on November 27, 2016, as part of the movie's promotion. They are joined by child stars Awra Briguela and Onyok Pineda who are also part of the movie.

Reception

Box office
Upon its release, The Super Parental Guardians eventually became a box office success earning ₱75 million on its first day breaking the record of My Bebe Love in 2015 which grossed Php 60.5 million on its first day. By December 8, 2016, the film already garnered at least ₱300 million.

About two weeks later on December 24, 2016, the film breached the ₱500 million mark. By January 3, 2017, the film already managed to earn ₱590.1 million

Critical response
It received generally negative reviews from critics. Oggs Cruz of Rappler gave a negative review, commenting on the film's plot as "unsurprisingly threadbare", and adds that "[it] fails to be the powerful thing it could and should have been [...] it desensitizes the public to the horrors of whatever is happening in society." Reviewer Jansen Musico of CNN Philippines was displeased with the film, commenting that "[T]his two-hour vaudeville is entertaining in small, healthy doses. Anything more feels like a waste of neurons." [...] [M]any of the film's jokes are one-offs that are overstuffed into a thin, flimsy script, bloating it with news and pop culture references that add nothing to the main story arc."

On the other hand, a reviewer from Philippine Daily Inquirer'''s Bandera praised the film, giving a score of 9 out of 10, writing that the film "is so light it perfectly fits for Pinoys who only want to be entertained this Christmas," and "delivers its purpose to make audiences laugh hard that many of them need despite with what's currently happening in the country.''"

References

External links

Official Trailer on YouTube

Philippine action comedy films
2016 action comedy films
2016 films
Star Cinema films
2016 comedy films
Films directed by Joyce Bernal